Gonzalo Fernández was Count of Burgos (ca. 899-915) and of Castile (c. 909-915).

Recorded for the first time in 899 as Count of Burgos, soon the region expanded to the eastern mountain valleys enabling Gonzalo to make his fort base in Lara, thus stretching his rule from the foot of the Cantabrian Mountains around Espinosa de los Monteros to the river Arlanza, which therefore became the border with the neighbouring Muslim territories. In order to stretch his territory this far, he first had to displace the Muslim forces based at the stronghold of Carazo that dominated the area and access. This was achieved after a long and well contested struggle.

The valley of Lara was then the rallying point of the family that - years later - achieved through his son, Fernán González the quasi-independence of Castile, securing the area for five generations with the family until it became a kingdom under Fernando I of Castile of the Jimenez dynasty.
His name appears for the first time in charter of the Monastery of San Pedro de Cardeña (899), one of the most influential monastic houses later in Castile together with the Monastery of Santo Domingo de Silos. He was also the founder of the other Monastic House of San Pedro de Arlanza (912).

In 912, he took the main role in the Castilian offensive to the river Duero, settling the old villages of Haza, Clunia and San Esteban de Gormaz.

Gonzalo Fernández appears as Count of Castile for the first time in a document of January 8, 914 and again on January 1, 915. He appears witnessing royal documents among other magnates and nobles at the Leonese Court main Assemblies until the defeat of the Leonese in the battle of Valdejunquera (920), after which he was considered dead. Modern scholars suspect that he must have been in disgrace at Court for some unrecorded mistake or other major offense typically resulting in exile, as somebody with his name and the then seldom given rank of Count - Gundisalvus comes - appears signing royal documents at the Court of Navarre between the years 924 and 930, the year that his son was given the authority of Count alone. Previously, his wife Muniadona, who seems to have been a member of the Asturian royal family, appears holding the patrimony estates and county regency during the minority of their son Fernán González.  They also had a son Ramiro.

His remains were laid to rest in a vault at San Pedro de Arlanza, as Friar Antonio de Yepes registers in his "General Chronicle". He was succeeded in Burgos by his brother, Nuño Fernández.

Counts of Spain
Counts of Castile
9th-century Asturian people
10th-century people from the Kingdom of León